The Impulse Drum and Bugle Corps is an Open Class competitive junior drum and bugle corps. Based in Buena Park, California,  Impulse performs in Drum Corps International (DCI) competitions. Impulse was the 2006 DCI Division III World Champion.

History
Sources: 

Impulse Youth Arts Organization was founded in Buena Park, California in the fall of 1998 with the intent of developing a culture that maintains character and accountability, teaching corps members to accommodate changes for innovation, and perfecting musical performance. The design goal of Impulse was to create a style that follows in the tradition of the Velvet Knights Drum and Bugle Corps from Anaheim, California and the Bridgemen Drum and Bugle Corps from Bayonne, New Jersey.

During its inaugural season, Impulse competed at seven competitions within California, placing 2nd at the DCI Pacific Championships in San Jose, California. In 2000, the corps expanded its tour to thirteen competitions throughout the Pacific Northwest. Impulse concluded with a 2nd place finish at Drums Along the Rockies in Denver, Colorado. In 2001, the corps mounted its first national tour to attend the DCI World Championship Prelims in Buffalo, New York and earned 9th place in Division II.

In 2006, Impulse moved to Division III and won the DCI Division III World Championship Title in Madison, Wisconsin, sweeping every caption. In 2007, the DCI World Championships were hosted for the first time in Pasadena, California. Impulse placed 6th in Division lll finals. Since 2008, Impulse has exclusively toured the west coast to maintain its commitment of uninterrupted financial stability and providing a high level drum and bugle corps experience to its local performers. In 2016, when the economic climate supported a national tour, Impulse travelled to DCI Open Division Championships in Indianapolis, Indiana.

Sponsorship
The Impulse Drum and Bugle Corps is an Impulse Youth Arts Organization performance ensemble. Byron Baba, Jr. is the President of the Board of Directors and Executive Director. Peter Connell is the Corps Director

Show summary (1999–2022)
Sources:

References

External links
Official website

Drum Corps International Open Class corps
Musical groups established in 1999
Organizations based in California
1999 establishments in California